Berthoud High School is a secondary school in Berthoud, Colorado, United States. In 2014 the school was ranked 30th in the state, 1,271st in the nation, and had an AP participation rate of 42%, according to U.S. News & World Report. For the 2014–2015 school year the student body makeup was 52% male and 49% female, and the total minority enrollment was 33 percent. Berthoud High School is 1 of 5 high schools in the Thompson School District R-2J and has the highest 4-year graduation rate in the district, with 91%.

The sports and extracurricular teams have a high success rate. In 2007 the football team won the state championship, and several of the members of the forensics team have gone to compete in the National Forensics League almost every year.  Their Vex robotics teams, whilst not being directly part of the school, consistently rank high in the state, and have gone to the world competition several times.

References

External links 

Thompson School District

Public high schools in Colorado
Schools in Larimer County, Colorado